Samantha Jones may refer to:
Samantha Jones (singer), British
Samantha Jones (Sex and the City), a character
Sam Jones (Doctor Who) or Samantha Jones, a character
Samantha Jones, one of the pseudonyms of Mary Millington
Samantha Jones (civil servant) chief operating officer of the Office of the Prime Minister (UK)

See also
Sam Jones (disambiguation)
Samuel Jones (disambiguation)
Jones (surname)